Daniel Patrick Etling (born July 22, 1994) is an American football quarterback for the Green Bay Packers of the National Football League (NFL). He played college football at Purdue and LSU, and was drafted by the New England Patriots in the seventh round of the 2018 NFL Draft. Etling also played for the Atlanta Falcons, Seattle Seahawks, Minnesota Vikings, and BC Lions.

High school career
Etling quarterbacked the Terre Haute South Vigo High School football team in Terre Haute, Indiana. He was poised for a big senior season after a disappointing junior year where the Braves started 3–0 before losing their final seven games. For his senior year, Etling threw for 1,505 yards and 11 touchdowns.

He is an Eagle Scout.

As a junior, Etling committed to Purdue University on April 17, 2012. He also received football scholarship offers from Colorado and Iowa. When Purdue head coach Danny Hope was fired, Etling stayed verbally committed to Purdue. Once Darrell Hazell was hired, Etling wanted to take the time to speak with Hazell before making a final decision on Purdue. Upon the completion of the first semester of his senior year of high school, Etling fulfilled his graduation requirements and decided to enroll at Purdue for the spring semester.

College career

Purdue
In the preseason of 2013, Etling was in a three-way quarterback battle with Rob Henry and Austin Appleby. When Henry was named the starter for the season, Purdue released its depth chart with Appleby listed as the number two quarterback. This led many to believe that Etling would utilize a redshirt.

After the Boilermakers started their 2013 season with an 0–3 record, and with Henry continuing to struggle in the team's fourth game, Etling was thrust into a game with Purdue trailing 27–10 to Northern Illinois. Etling finished the game with 241 yards passing while throwing two touchdowns and two interceptions. During the ensuing week, Etling was named the starter for the Boilermakers against Nebraska. Purdue struggled in Etling's first start, losing 44–7. Overall, Etling appeared in eight games, passing for 1690 yards, ten touchdowns, and seven interceptions, with a 116.1 quarterback rating. The team finished with a 1–11 record.

Going into the 2014 season, Etling was named the starter. However, during the season Etling was moved second on the depth chart, behind Appleby. Etling appeared in five games, passing for 800 yards, six touchdowns, five interceptions, and a 102.5 quarterback rating. Purdue's record for the season was 3–9.

On June 11, 2015, Etling asked for and was granted a release on his scholarship from Purdue.

LSU
On June 22, 2015, it was announced that Etling would transfer to Louisiana State University (LSU). Due to NCAA transfer rules, Etling sat out the 2015 season. He served as the starting quarterback for the LSU Tigers during their 2016 and 2017 seasons, playing a total of 24 games. In 2016, the Tigers were 7–4 during the regular season and defeated the Louisville Cardinals in the 2016 Citrus Bowl played on December 31. In 2017, the Tigers had a 9–3 regular season record, and lost to Notre Dame in the 2018 Citrus Bowl played on January 1. Etling passed for a total of 4,586 yards, 27 touchdowns, seven interceptions, and had a quarterback rating of 144.4 in his two seasons with LSU.

Statistics

Professional career

New England Patriots
Etling was drafted by the New England Patriots in the seventh round (219th overall) of the 2018 NFL Draft.

In the Patriots' first preseason game of the 2018 season, Etling completed two of five passes for 21 yards and no touchdowns. In the final preseason game, Etling went 18-32 for 157 yards with one touchdown pass and two interceptions. He also ran for 113 yards on seven carries, including an 86-yard touchdown run. Etling holds the record for longest quarterback run in Patriots preseason history.

On September 1, 2018, Etling was waived by the Patriots and was signed to the practice squad the next day. Etling won Super Bowl LIII with the Patriots when they defeated the Los Angeles Rams 13–3. He signed a reserve/future contract with the Patriots on February 5, 2019.

At the start of the 2019 season's training camp, Etling transitioned to the wide receiver position. He was waived on August 13, 2019.

Atlanta Falcons
On August 14, 2019, Etling was claimed off waivers by the Atlanta Falcons. He no longer was making the transition to wide receiver and switched back to full time quarterback. He was waived on August 31, 2019, and was signed to the practice squad the next day. On October 26, after an injury to starter Matt Ryan, Etling was promoted to the active roster as the team's backup quarterback ahead of their Week 8 matchup. He was waived on October 28, and re-signed to the practice squad. On December 30, 2019, Etling was signed to a reserve/future contract.

Etling was placed on the reserve/COVID-19 list by the Falcons on July 31, 2020, and was activated five days later. On August 17, the Falcons waived Etling.

Seattle Seahawks
On August 18, 2020, Etling was claimed off waivers by the Seattle Seahawks. On September 5, 2020, Etling was waived from the Seahawks, and signed to the team's practice squad the next day. On January 11, 2021, Etling signed a reserve/futures contract with the Seahawks. He was waived on August 1, 2021.

Minnesota Vikings
On August 2, 2021, Etling was claimed off waivers by the Minnesota Vikings. He was waived on August 23.

BC Lions
On September 10, 2021, Etling was signed by the BC Lions to their practice roster. He was waived three weeks later to pursue NFL opportunities.

Seattle Seahawks (second stint)
On October 13, 2021, Etling was signed by the Seattle Seahawks to their practice squad. He was released on October 27.

Denver Broncos
On November 13, 2021, Etling was signed to the Denver Broncos practice squad due to backup Drew Lock testing positive for Covid-19. He was released three days later after Drew Lock returned.

Green Bay Packers
On December 7, 2021, Etling was signed to the Green Bay Packers practice squad in the wake of Packers backup quarterback Jordan Love being placed on the COVID-19 reserve list. He was released six days later.

Jacksonville Jaguars
On December 20, 2021, Etling was signed to the Jacksonville Jaguars practice squad.

Green Bay Packers (second stint)
On January 25, 2022, Etling signed a reserve/future contract with the Green Bay Packers. He was waived on August 30, 2022, and signed to the practice squad the next day. He signed a reserve/future contract on January 10, 2023.

References

External links
 Green Bay Packers bio
 LSU Tigers bio
 Purdue Boilermakers bio

1994 births
Living people
American football quarterbacks
Atlanta Falcons players
LSU Tigers football players
New England Patriots players
Players of American football from Indiana
Purdue Boilermakers football players
Sportspeople from Terre Haute, Indiana
American football wide receivers
Seattle Seahawks players
Minnesota Vikings players
Denver Broncos players
Green Bay Packers players
Jacksonville Jaguars players